AFA Olaine is a Latvian football club. They compete in the second-highest division of Latvian football (1. līga) and the Latvian Football Cup.

First-team squad
As of 30 April 2017.

References

External links
 

Olaine
Olaine